The Scratch Players Championship (SPC) was an annual amateur golf tournament that was played from 2000 to 2010.  It was a 72-hole stroke play event with 2 cuts.  It was a top 20 in world amateur event in 2010 per the world's only amateur tournament ranking at scratchplayers.org/EventRank10.html as well as a "category A" tournament in the World Amateur Golf Ranking, meaning it was one of the top 30 men's amateur tournaments in the world.  The SPC has a top 25 in world amateur field in both 2009 and 2007.

The tournament was discontinued when the USGA moved the US Amateur one week earlier permanently commencing in 2012, which was the time slot the SPC was held annually near where the US Amateur was held, along with the burden for the SPC Founder & Tournament Director to prepare for the event while concurrently administering the world's largest and most accurate world amateur ranking, the Scratch Players World Amateur Ranking (SPWAR).

The SPC set and still holds the amateur tournament record, for both winning score and average score, at every golf course that has hosted the event.  This tournament record is for both amateurs and professionals for all years except 2004, 2005 and 2006.  All SPC Champions turned professional.  From 2006, the SPC had players from at least 15 countries in the field each year held.

Winners

References

External links
Official site
List of winners

Amateur golf tournaments in the United States
Golf in California
Golf in Minnesota
Golf in Oklahoma
Golf in Washington (state)